Metropolitan counties are a type of county-level administrative division of England. There are six metropolitan counties, which each cover large urban areas, with populations between 1 and 3 million. They were created in 1974 and are each divided into several metropolitan districts or boroughs. Following the abolition of metropolitan county councils in 1986, metropolitan counties no longer form a part of local government in England. Most of their functions were devolved to the metropolitan boroughs, making the boroughs effectively unitary authorities; any remaining functions were taken over by joint boards.

The metropolitan counties have population densities of between 900 (South Yorkshire) and 3,200 (West Midlands) people/km2.  Individual metropolitan districts range from 4,000 people/km2 in Liverpool to only 500 people/km2 in Doncaster. Residents of metropolitan counties account for around 22% of the population of England, or 18% of the United Kingdom.

Counties and districts
The six metropolitan counties and their metropolitan districts are:

History

Creation
The idea of creating administrative areas based upon the large conurbations outside London, modelled on the County of London or Greater London, was mooted several times in the 20th century. In 1948, the Local Government Boundary Commission proposed several new counties, including 'South East Lancashire North East Cheshire' ("Selnec"), and 'South West Lancashire North West Cheshire'. In the 1960s the Local Government Commission for England proposed such an arrangement for Tyneside and draft proposals considered it for Selnec. For the West Midlands conurbation, the commission proposed instead a group of contiguous county boroughs with no overall metropolitan authority.

The Redcliffe-Maud Report of 1969 proposed the creation of three large "metropolitan areas" based upon the conurbations surrounding Manchester, Liverpool and Birmingham (Selnec, Merseyside, and West Midlands), which were to have both metropolitan councils covering the entire areas, and district councils covering parts. Harold Wilson's government published a white paper broadly accepting these recommendations, and adding South Yorkshire and West Yorkshire as metropolitan areas.

The proposals were radically altered when Edward Heath's Conservative government came to power in 1970. The Conservatives' local government white paper was published in February 1971, naming the metropolitan areas "metropolitan counties", and giving them as "Merseyside, south-east Lancashire and north-east Cheshire, the West Midlands, West Yorkshire, South Yorkshire, and the Tyne and Wear area".

The proposed counties were also far smaller than in the original proposals; they were trimmed at each successive stage. The Redcliffe-Maud Report had included Chester in Merseyside and Redditch and Stafford in West Midlands. The Conservative policy favoured retaining historic boundaries as far as was practicable, and the new white paper proposals generally reduced the metropolitan counties to the continuously built up area. Many areas on the edges were excluded from the metropolitan counties when the bill was passed: Easington, Harrogate, Knaresborough, Ellesmere Port, Neston, New Mills, Whaley Bridge and Glossop; other areas were excluded during the bill's passage, such as Seaham, Skelmersdale and Holland, Poynton and Wilmslow. One area, the county borough of Southport, was added to Merseyside in the bill, at the local council's request.

Several other proposals for metropolitan counties were made during the bill's passage, including a revival of the proposal for Hampshire (either the southern part or all of it) and central Lancashire. A Thamesside metropolitan county, covering areas of north Kent and south Essex on the Thames Estuary (and now considered part of the Thames Gateway) was also proposed.

The metropolitan counties were created by the Local Government Act 1972. The county councils were first elected in 1973, and were formally established in April 1974.

Structure
The metropolitan counties were first created with a two-tier structure of local government. Local government functions were divided between the metropolitan district councils as lower tier authorities and metropolitan county councils as the upper tier.

The structure differed from the non-metropolitan counties in the allocation of powers between the county and district councils. The metropolitan districts had more powers than non-metropolitan districts, in that they were additionally responsible for education and social services, responsibilities allocated to county councils elsewhere.

The metropolitan county councils were intended to be strategic authorities that ran regional services such as main roads, public transport, emergency services, civil protection, waste disposal, and strategic town and country planning. The metropolitan county councils functioned between 1974 and 1986.

Abolition of the county councils
Just a decade after they were established, the mostly Labour-controlled metropolitan county councils (MCCs) and the Greater London Council (GLC) had several high-profile clashes with the Conservative government of Margaret Thatcher about overspending and high rates. 
Government policy on the issue was considered throughout 1982, and the Conservative Party put a "promise to scrap the metropolitan county councils", and the GLC, in their manifesto for the 1983 general election.

The exact details of the reform caused problems. In October 1983, it published a white paper entitled Streamlining the cities which set out detailed plans for the abolition of the MCCs, together with the abolition of the GLC.

The bill was announced in the Queen's Speech and was introduced into Parliament soon afterwards. It became the Local Government Act 1985; the MCCs and the GLC were abolished at midnight on 31 March 1986.

The last elections to the councils were held in May 1981; elections that would have been held in 1985 were abandoned under the Local Government (Interim Provisions) Act 1984; the original plan had been for councillors' terms to expire in April 1985, and for councillors to be replaced by nominees from borough councils until 1986.

While the abolition of the GLC was highly controversial, the abolition of the MCCs was much less so. The Liberal Party leader David Steel had supported abolition of the MCCs in his 1981 conference speech . The government's stated reasons for the abolition of the MCCs were based on efficiency and their overspending.

However the fact that all of the county councils were controlled by the Labour Party led to accusations that their abolition was motivated by party politics: the general secretary of the National and Local Government Officers' Association described it as a "completely cynical manoeuvre". Merseyside in particular put up a struggle against abolition. Most of the functions of the MCCs passed either to the metropolitan borough councils, or to joint boards. Some assets were given to residuary bodies for disposal. The split of functions from the metropolitan county councils was as follows:

Current status

The metropolitan counties are sometimes referred to as "former metropolitan counties", although this description is not entirely correct.  The county councils were abolished, but under the Local Government Act 1972, the counties themselves remain in existence, although they no longer exist in ISO 3166-2:GB as extant administrative subdivisions.

By virtue of the Lieutenancies Act 1997 they remain as ceremonial counties (sometimes called 'geographic counties') which have an appointed Lord Lieutenant. They are also used in certain government statistics, although they no longer appear on Ordnance Survey maps, which show the individual metropolitan boroughs.

Some local services are still run on a metropolitan county-wide basis, administered by statutory joint boards and special joint arrangements; these include policing (by joint police authorities), fire services, public transport (by passenger transport executives) and waste disposal (in Merseyside and Greater Manchester). These joint boards are made up of councillors appointed by the boroughs. Since 2000, the metropolitan counties have been used as the areas of joint local transport plans.

In 1999, following a successful referendum, the Labour government under Tony Blair legislated to create a strategic authority for London (the Greater London Authority). Despite some talk of doing so, no bodies were established to replace the MCCs. The Blair government instead pursued the idea of elected regional assemblies, although after an unsuccessful referendum in the most positive region, the North East, this idea now has few proponents. The idea of city regions has been proposed subsequently, although the 2006 local government white paper had no firm proposals for formal recognition of this concept. This changed in 2010 when the Government accepted a proposal from the Association of Greater Manchester Authorities to establish a Greater Manchester Combined Authority as an indirectly elected, top tier, strategic authority for Greater Manchester. In 2014 similar indirectly elected combined authorities were established for the metropolitan counties of South Yorkshire and West Yorkshire, and two combined authorities were established which each covered a metropolitan county and adjacent non-metropolitan districts: the Liverpool City Region Combined Authority for Merseyside and the Borough of Halton unitary authority, and the North East Combined Authority for Tyne and Wear and the unitary authorities of County Durham and Northumberland. In 2017 the West Midlands Combined Authority was established for the West Midlands county. Many of these new combined authorities have elected or are in the process of electing authority-wide regional mayors.

Since 1995, the cities of Birmingham, Bristol, Leeds, Liverpool, Manchester, Newcastle, Nottingham and Sheffield have assembled together in the Core Cities Group. This organisation accords no distinct legal status on these councils over any other city council in England but appears to be organically moving towards some kind of recognition of their role as regional capitals outside London.

See also
List of local governments in the United Kingdom

External links
Map of the UK counties and unitary administrations
Map of all UK local authorities

References

Types of administrative division
 
Local government in England
Interested parties in planning in England
1972 establishments in England